Sclerotinia bulborum is a plant pathogen infecting the bulbs of plants, causing black slime disease. It affects a number of ornamental bulbous plants including Iris, Hyacinth, Muscari and Narcissus

References

Bibliography

External links 
 Index Fungorum
 USDA ARS Fungal Database
 Fungi of the United States
 Mycobank

Fungal plant pathogens and diseases
Sclerotiniaceae